A kotar is a type of prepared guitar with a sound reminiscent of the koto.  Guitarist Kaki King used a kotar on the hidden track at the end of her album Legs to Make Us Longer.

References

Experimental string instruments